Jasmin Gabriela Soto López (born 11 January 1993) is a Guatemalan professional racing cyclist, who currently rides for Colombian amateur team Liro Sport.

Major results

2014
 2nd Road race, National Road Championships
2015
 1st  Road race, National Road Championships
 2nd Overall Vuelta Femenina a Guatemala
2016
 2nd Road race, National Road Championships
2017
 National Road Championships
2nd Road race
2nd Time trial
2018
 National Road Championships
1st  Road race
2nd Time trial
 3rd Overall Vuelta Femenina a Guatemala
 10th Overall Vuelta Internacional Femenina a Costa Rica
2019
 2nd Time trial, National Road Championships
 4th Overall Vuelta Femenina a Guatemala
2021
 National Road Championships
1st  Road race
1st  Time trial
 6th Overall Vuelta Femenina a Guatemala

References

External links

1993 births
Living people
Guatemalan female cyclists
Place of birth missing (living people)
Cyclists at the 2019 Pan American Games
Pan American Games competitors for Guatemala
21st-century Guatemalan women